Oliver Brown (born 18 August 1994) in Dronfield, Derbyshire is an English snooker player. He will turn professional at the start of the 2022/2023 season. He earned a two-year tour card after winning the men's EBSA European Snooker Championship in October 2021.

Career

2013/2014 season
Brown played in a stage of any ranking event in the first time in the 2013/2014 season. However, he lost in the first qualifying stage of the Australian Open to Joel Walker 5–3. Brown qualified for his first ever ranking tournament's venue stages in October 2013, beating Nigel Bond in the qualifying stage 6–3 in the International Championship. However, he lost in the first round in Chengdu by a 6–4 scoreline to Mark Davis.

2014/2015 season
In the first ranking event of the 2014–15 season, Brown was drawn against Chinese snooker star Ding Junhui in the Wuxi Classic. He beat Ding 5–0 in emphatic fashion, qualifying for a second ranking tournament. Brown continued his good form in China, beating Oliver Lines 5–1 in the last 64 stage, before losing to Martin Gould 5–1. Brown entered in the second ranking event of the season, the Australian Goldfields Open. He had to play four qualifying rounds to get to the venue stage. In the end, he beat Andrew Norman 5–3, Dave Harold 5–1 and Gary Wilson 5–3 before losing in the final qualifying round to Tom Ford 5–1.

Brown qualified for the International Championship by beating Jamie Cope and lost 6–1 to Mark Williams in the first round. Brown was drawn against reigning world champion Mark Selby in the first round of the UK Championship and was whitewashed 6–0. At the Welsh Open he beat Mike Dunn 4–3 and home favourite Ryan Day 4–1 to reach the last 32 of a ranking event for the second time this season. Brown suffered a 4–0 defeat against Luca Brecel and his season would come to an end with a heavy 10–1 loss to Liam Highfield in the first round of World Championship qualifying. He entered Q School, but could only win a total of two matches to fall short of earning a place on the tour.

Performance and rankings timeline

Career finals

Amateur finals: 3 (2 titles)

References 

English snooker players
People from Dronfield
Living people
1994 births
Sportspeople from Derbyshire